Bartholomew Diggins (October 9, 1844 – February 23, 1917) was a United States Navy sailor and a recipient of America's highest military decoration—the Medal of Honor—for actions in the American Civil War.

Biography
Bartholomew Diggins was born in County Kerry Ireland. He entered the U.S. Navy from Maryland and served during the Civil War as an ordinary seaman on Rear Admiral David Farragut's flagship . He was awarded the Medal of Honor in recognition of his conduct during this action. Bartholomew Diggins died in Washington, D.C., and was buried at Arlington National Cemetery, in Arlington, Virginia.

Medal of Honor citation
Citation:

On board the flagship, U.S.S. Hartford, during action against rebel forts and gunboats and with the ram Tennessee  in Mobile Bay, 5 August 1864. Despite damage to his ship and the loss of several men on board as enemy fire raked her decks, DIGGINS, as loader of a gun, remained steadfast as his post throughout the furious 2-hour battle which resulted in the surrender of the rebel ram Tennessee and in the damaging and destruction of batteries at Fort Morgan.

See also
 List of American Civil War Medal of Honor recipients: A–F

References

External links
 
 
 Navy General Order No. 391, November 12, 1891, order granting medal.
 

1844 births
1917 deaths
Burials at Arlington National Cemetery
United States Navy Medal of Honor recipients
United States Navy sailors
American Civil War recipients of the Medal of Honor